Yauhen Mikalaevich Tsurkin (Łacinka: Jaŭhien Mikałajevič Curkin; born 9 November 1990) is a Belarusian swimmer, who specialized in sprint freestyle and butterfly events.

Career
He won a bronze medal in the 50 m butterfly at the 2012 European Aquatics Championships in Debrecen, Hungary, in a new Belarusian record time of 23.37 seconds.

Tsurkin qualified for the men's 100 m freestyle, as a member of the Belarusian swimming team, at the 2012 Summer Olympics in London, by attaining a B-standard entry time of 49.62 seconds at the European Championships. He challenged seven other swimmers in the fourth heat, including British-born Paraguayan swimmer Benjamin Hockin. Tsurkin edged out sixth-place finisher Gabriel Melconian Alvez of Uruguay by fifteen hundredths of a second (0.15), slower than his qualifying time of 50.53 seconds. Tsurkin failed to advance into the semifinals, as he placed thirty-fourth out of 60 swimmers in the preliminaries.

At the 2012 European Short Course Swimming Championships in Chartres, France, Tsurkin lowered his national record time to 22.73 seconds, but was narrowly beaten by France's Frédérick Bousquet for top seeding in the semifinals of the men's 50 m butterfly.

He won the 50 m butterfly at the 2014 European Championships.

At the 2016 Summer Olympics, he competed in the 50 m butterfly and the 100 m freestyle, but did not progress from the heats in either event.  His wife, Aliaksandra Herasimenia, won a bronze medal in the 50 m freestyle in Rio.

References

External links
NBC Olympics Profile

1990 births
Living people
Belarusian male swimmers
Olympic swimmers of Belarus
Swimmers at the 2012 Summer Olympics
Swimmers at the 2016 Summer Olympics
Male butterfly swimmers
Belarusian male freestyle swimmers
Sportspeople from Gomel
European Aquatics Championships medalists in swimming
Medalists at the FINA World Swimming Championships (25 m)
Universiade medalists in swimming
Universiade gold medalists for Belarus
Universiade silver medalists for Belarus
Universiade bronze medalists for Belarus
Medalists at the 2013 Summer Universiade
Medalists at the 2015 Summer Universiade
Swimmers at the 2020 Summer Olympics